Madhouse is a 1990 American black comedy film starring Kirstie Alley and John Larroquette. Written and directed by Tom Ropelewski, it was produced by Leslie Dixon and released by Orion Pictures.

Plot 
Stockbroker Mark Bannister and his TV reporter/anchorwoman wife Jessie are a successful yuppie couple with an idyllic California life, aside from a toilet with a faulty handle. It is interrupted when Mark's timid cousin Fred, and his pregnant wife Bernice fly in from New Jersey. The first days are slightly chaotic thanks to Bernice's cat Scruffy. Mark gives them $300 to spend in the city, but his alone time with Jessie is interrupted when her gold-digger sister Claudia arrives after a fight with her rich Middle Eastern husband Kaddir, whom she divorces after he cancels her credit cards. Fred and Bernice's visit, meant to last only five days, is extended when Bernice falls on the way to the car. She is instructed by her doctor, Dr. Penix, to stay put until the baby is born.

At a local bar, Mark motivates Fred to quit being Bernice's pet, but Fred takes the message too far and leaves "to find himself." Meanwhile, Mark's next door neighbor and carpenter Dale builds a machine to keep Bernice comfortable in bed all day. Bernice becomes increasingly irritating, insisting on being waited on hand and foot and demanding constant funerals and burials for Scruffy, who dies multiple times but comes back each time. Claudia's son Jonathan also comes to live with them. Jessie tries getting Dale to seduce Claudia, but Mark and Jessie inadvertently burn down Dale's villa. Since it can't be rebuilt for three months, Dale and his two teens, delinquent son C.K. and phone-obsessed daughter Katy, move in, and Mark and Jessie are forced to take them in to avoid an arson lawsuit. Meanwhile, Mark helps Jonathan get a job as a mailroom clerk at his office.

As days pass, chaos persists, and Mark and Jessie are essentially forced out of their own home. When Mark fails to show up for work, his friend and colleague Wes finds the couple outside living like hippies. Wes motivates Mark to resist a little longer; he's on the verge of closing a successful deal for his boss, Bob Grindle.  At work, Mark gets a box from  Bogota containing cocaine—sent to him but requested by Jonathan. Grindle tells Mark to sell a set of stocks due to a scandal, but Mark forgets to before leaving work with the cocaine. Fred returns, having grown a mustache and acquiring a baby elephant. Police arrive at the house and find Scruffy ODing on cocaine; they destroy the Bannister house during the drug bust, which Jessie's TV station televises. Seeing it, the overstressed Jessie bursts into an expletive-filled mental breakdown on live TV. Pushed to their limit and facing apparent ruin and imminent charges, Mark and Jessie decide to abandon the house to their guests and leave town to start new lives.

The next day, when Mark and Jessie return to salvage what they can, they hear a recording from Dr. Penix stating that Bernice was actually never pregnant, and their last shred of sanity dissolves. An enraged Jessie catapults Bernice from her bed to the backyard and forces her to confess to knowing she wasn't pregnant. She then ruins Claudia's expensive clothes to force her out, while Mark terrorizes Dale with an electric saw until he and his kids leave. Lastly, Jessie puts fireworks in Jonathan's cocaine bag, which explodes as he tries to flee in Dale's (loaner) Lotus. Mark and Jessie then threaten to torch their own house in order to keep their parasitic visitors away for good. The police arrive and apologize, stating that their only evidence—Scruffy—disappeared, and that they will pay for all damages incurred. Grindle arrives and, believing Mark had meant to keep the stocks, declares that he amassed a small fortune when the scandal was found to be false. He offers Mark a portion of the profit and a promotion. Claudia takes the opportunity to seduce Grindle, and Dale flirts with one of the police officers, much to C.K's chagrin. Scruffy returns from the police-station evidence room, but is determined to stay with Mark and Jessie. Bernice and Fred depart, with Fred taking much more control than before. Jessie and Mark are about to get cozy, but first Mark smashes the ever-malfunctioning toilet with a sledgehammer.

The epilogue states that Jessie's furious on-air outburst earned her her own TV show, and she and Mark moved into a three-bedroom house in Malibu and lived happily ever after...until their parents came to visit.

Cast 
 John Larroquette as Mark Bannister
 Kirstie Alley as Jessie Bannister
 Alison La Placa as Claudia, Jessie's sister
 John Diehl as Fred Bannister, Mark's cousin
 Jessica Lundy as Bernice Bannister, Fred's wife
 Bradley Gregg as Jonathan, Claudia's son
 Dennis Miller as Wes, Mark's colleague
 Robert Ginty as Dale, the Bannister's neighbor
 Wayne Tippit as Mr. Grindle, Mark's boss
 Paul Eiding as Stark
 Aeryk Egan as C.K., Dale's son
 Deborah Otto as Katy

Production 
The film was written and directed by Tom Ropelewski, and produced by Leslie Dixon. The cinematographer was Denis Lewiston.

Reception 
On Rotten Tomatoes, the film has a score of 0% based on reviews from 6 critics. 
Roger Ebert gave it 2 out of 4 stars. The Los Angeles Times gave it a negative review and People magazine.

References

External links 
 
 

1990 films
1990 comedy films
American comedy films
Films set in California
Orion Pictures films
Films scored by David Newman
1990 directorial debut films
1990s English-language films
1990s American films